The Men's United States Squash Open 2021 was the men's edition of the 2021 United States Open (squash), which was a 2021–22 PSA World Tour Platinum event (prize money: $150,000). The event took place at the Arlen Specter US Squash Center in Philadelphia, Pennsylvania in the United States from the 1st of October to the 6th of October.

Mostafa Asal of Egypt won his first PSA World Tour Platinum event title by beating fellow countryman Tarek Momen in the final, winning in five games with a score of 5–11, 5–11, 11–9, 12–10, 11–3.

Seeds

Draw and results

Semi-finals and final

Main draw

Top half

Bottom half

See also
 Women's United States Open (squash) 2021

References

Men's United States Open
Squash in the United States
United States Open
United States Open
United States Open